The Kenyan National Chess Championship is an annual individual chess tournament typically held in December and organized by . It serves as the flagship event of the year and the first stage of the qualification system for the Chess Olympiad and the All African Games.

Winners

{| class="sortable wikitable"
! Year !! Champion
|-
| 1990 ||Lawrence Kagambi
|- 
| 1993 ||Humphrey Andolo
|-
| 1994 || 
|- 
| 1995 ||Humphrey Andolo
|-
| 1996 ||Philip Nicholas Odhiambo
|-
| 1997 ||Humphrey Andolo
|- 
| 1998 ||Humphrey Andolo
|-
| 1999 ||Humphrey Andolo
|-
| 2001 ||Kenneth Ajode Omolo
|-
| 2003 ||Matthew Kamau Kanegeni
|-
| 2005 ||Nathan Mukaka Ateka
|-
| 2006 ||Ben Magana
|-
| 2007 ||Peter Gilruth
|-
| 2013 ||Ben Magana
|-
| 2014 ||Mehul Gohil
|-
| 2015 ||Kenneth Ajode Omolo
|-
|2017
|Ben Magana 
|-
|2018
|Victor Ngani 
|-
|2019
|Mehul Gohil 
|-
|2021
|Martin Njoroge
|}

References
9.https://www.pd.co.ke/sports/2021-kenya-national-chess-championship-produces-new-champions-108042/?amp=1 December 2021.

Chess in Kenya
Chess national championships
Sports competitions in Kenya